Methyl isothiocyanate is the organosulfur compound with the formula CH3N=C=S.  This low melting colorless solid is a powerful lachrymator.  As a precursor to a variety of valuable bioactive compounds, it is the most important organic isothiocyanate in industry.

Synthesis
It is prepared industrially by two routes.  Annual production in 1993 was estimated to be 4,000 tonnes.  The main method involves the thermal rearrangement of methyl thiocyanate:
CH3S−C≡N   →   CH3N=C=S
It is also prepared via with the reaction of methylamine with carbon disulfide followed by oxidation of the resulting dithiocarbamate with hydrogen peroxide.  A related method is useful to prepare this compound in the laboratory.

MITC forms naturally upon the enzymatic degradation of glucocapparin, a glucoside found in capers.

Reactions
A characteristic reaction is with amines to give methyl thioureas:

CH3NCS  +  R2NH →  R2NC(S)NHCH3

Other nucleophiles add similarly.

Applications
Solutions of MITC are used in agriculture as soil fumigants, mainly for protection against fungi and nematodes. 

MITC is a building block for the synthesis of 1,3,4-thiadiazoles, which are heterocyclic compounds used as herbicides.  Commercial products include "Spike", "Ustilan," and "Erbotan."

Well known pharmaceuticals prepared using MITC include Zantac and Tagamet. Suritozole is a third example.

MITC is used in the Etasuline patent (Ex2), although the compound is question (Ex6) is with EITC.

Safety
MITC is a dangerous lachrymator as well as being poisonous.

See also
 6-MITC
 Bhopal disaster

References

Methyl esters
Isothiocyanates
Lachrymatory agents